Vitaly Stepanovich Logvinovsky PAR  (17 March 1941 – 22 August 2019) was a Soviet and later Russian stage and film actor.

Biography
He was born on 17 March 1941. Vitaly's father worked as an accountant, his mother taught mathematics.

Vitaly  did not plan to become an actor, intended to enter the design department of the  Kuibyshev Aviation Institute (now Samara State Aerospace University), but his passion for the theater won.

In 1965 he graduated from GITIS.

Worked in Pavlodar Drama Theatre since 1967, later Volgograd Drama Theatre. Since 1974  —  actor Kaluga Regional Drama Theatre.

Awarded Honored Artist of the RSFSR (16 November 1983) and People's Artist of Russia (15 February 2006). Repeatedly awarded with diplomas and prizes of the Department of Culture and Art of the Kaluga Oblast and Ministry of Culture of the Russia in the category  Best Actor of the season.

Death
Logvinovsky died on 22 August 2019 in Kaluga in the 79th year of his life after an illness.

Works

Theatre
Victor in Firm Nails Do not Do by Leonid Zhukhovitsky:  
Smerdyakov and Ivan in The Brothers Karamazov by Fyodor Dostoevsky 
Tuzenbakh in Three Sisters by Anton Chekhov 
Tyurin in Pretenders by Emil Braginsky and Eldar Ryazanov 
Ivan the Terrible in Vasilisa Melentyeva by Alexander Ostrovsky
Podkolesin in Marriage by Nikolai Gogol
Napoleon in Napoleon by Ferdinand Bruckner 
Lucky in Forest by Ostrovsky
Comforting in Players by Gogol
Gradoboev in Hot Нeart by Ostrovsky
Scapa in Dodger by Molière 
Balyasnikov in Tales of Old Arbat by Aleksei Arbuzov 
Zheltukhin in Killer Whale by Lev Tolstoy
Sergei Ivanovich Sakhatov in The Fruits of Enlightenment by Tolstoy
Francis Walsingham (Minister of Police) in Private Life of the Queen by Elena Poddubnaya 
Richard Willey in №13 by Ray Cooney
Christian Ivanovich Gibner (district doctor) in Inspector by Gogol 
Writer in Uncle's Dream by Dostoevsky 
Batu in Little Tenderness by Aldo Nicolai
Plyushkin in Brother Chichikov by Nina Sadur
Nyuhin; Chubukov; Howler-Sentries; comedian Svetlovidov in Svetlovidov's Benefit by Chekhov

Film and television

References

External links
Vitaliy Logvinovsky  Online Film Teatr.ru
 Vitaliy Logvinovsky  at the  KinoPoisk 
 Vitaly Logvinovsky on  Kaluga  Drama Theatre website

1941 births
Russian male film actors
Russian male stage actors
Soviet male stage actors
2019 deaths
People's Artists of Russia
Russian Academy of Theatre Arts alumni
Honored Artists of the RSFSR
People from Poltava Oblast